Garmak may refer to:

 Grimacco, Italy
 Garmak, Hamadan, a village in Hamadan Province, Iran
 Garmak, Jajrom, a village in North Khorasan Province, Iran
 Garmak, Maneh and Samalqan, a village in North Khorasan Province, Iran
 Garmak, Qazvin, a village in Qazvin Province, Iran
 Garmak, Razavi Khorasan, a village in Razavi Khorasan Province, Iran